Lashkenar or Lash Kenar may refer to:
 Lashkenar, Nowshahr
 Lash Kenar, Nur